Culpeper Times is a newspaper in Culpeper, Virginia,  covering local news, sports, business and community.  It was founded in 1889.   The newspaper is a weekly, with a circulation of 5,000 copies  It is owned by Rappahannock Media LLC, which purchased it in July 2014 from Virginia Media Group. Rappahannock Media LLC also owns InsideNoVa.com, a news web site serving all of Northern Virginia, as well as two other weekly newspapers: Rappahannock News and InsideNoVa/Prince William.

References

Newspapers published in Virginia
1889 establishments in Virginia
Newspapers established in 1889